The 1975 Piccadilly World Match Play Championship was the 12th World Match Play Championship. It was played from Thursday 9 to Saturday 11 October on the West Course at Wentworth. Eight players competed in a straight knock-out competition, with each match contested over 36 holes. The champion received £10,000 out of a total prize fund of £30,000. In the final, defending champion Hale Irwin beat Al Geiberger 4 & 2.

Course
Source:

Scores
Source:

Prize money
The winner received £10,000, the runner-up £5,000, the losing semi-finalists £3,500 and the first round losers £2,000, making a total prize fund of £30,000.

References

Volvo World Match Play Championship
Golf tournaments in England
Piccadilly World Match Play Championship
Piccadilly World Match Play Championship
October 1975 sports events in the United Kingdom